The Rural Municipality of Lajord No. 128 is a rural municipality (RM) in the Canadian province of Saskatchewan within Census Division No. 6 and  Division No. 2. It is located in the southeast portion of the province.

History 
The RM of Lajord No. 128 incorporated as a rural municipality on December 13, 1909.

Heritage properties
There are three historical buildings located within the RM.
Church and Grotto in St. Peter's Colony (now called St. Peter's Colony) - Constructed in 1905 as a church and shrine of our Lady of Lourdes.
Kronau Cemetery Site (formerly called Bethlehem Lutheran Church Cemetery; and now called the Kronau Bethlehem Heritage Cemetery) - Constructed in 1896, by early German-Russian Lutheran homesteaders. The cemetery is near the site of a former one room school house where services were held until a church was constructed. The cemetery is located near the hamlet of Kronau.

Geography

Communities and localities 
The following unincorporated communities are within the RM.

Organized hamlets
Davin
Gray
Kronau
Riceton

Demographics 

Government 
The RM of Lajord No. 128 is governed by an elected municipal council and an appointed administrator that meets on the second Tuesday of every month. The reeve of the RM is Armond Gervais while its administrator is Lynette Herauf. The RM's office is located in Lajord.

References 

Lajord

Division No. 6, Saskatchewan